Azadi march could refer to:
 2014 Azadi march
 2019 Azadi march
 2022 Azadi march
 2022 Azadi March-II